Jasper Kim is an attorney, author, media contributor, professor, and expert in international business law, negotiation strategy (technology, culture and ethics), and contemporary East–West issues and trends from a socio-economic and legal (interdisciplinary) perspective.

Early life and education

Jasper Kim was born in Toronto, Canada. He has lived in six countries, three in Asia (Japan, China, and South Korea) and three in the West (Canada, United States and England). His parents emigrated from Seoul, South Korea in the early 1970s. His early years were spent in Canada and the United States.

He attended the University of California, San Diego (BA, Economics; BA, Third World Studies), the London School of Economics (MSc), University of London (MBA), Rutgers Law School (Doctor of Law), and Christ Church, University of Oxford (MSc Taxation; Faculty of Law and Said Business School).

He also received training at Harvard Law School's Program on Negotiation. He was a visiting scholar at Stanford University and Harvard University.

Career
Kim began his career as an in-house legal counsel for Lehman Brothers in Tokyo, Japan working on non-performing loans (NPLs), fixed income products, and structured products (including derivative products and ABS issuances). He was then recruited to work for Barclays Capital in Hong Kong, China, as part of the Investment Banking division's Structured Products Trading Desk.

Kim is currently at the Graduate School of International Studies (GSIS) at Ewha Womans University, in Seoul, South Korea.  His courses include International Business Law, International Negotiation Strategy, and International Finance and Financial Institutions. He is also an adjunct faculty member for the Straus Institute for Dispute Resolution. He is also a senior fellow at Melbourne Law School, teaching in both the JD and LLM programs.

As a visiting scholar at Harvard University, Kim provided his insight on East Asian law schools at Harvard Law School as well as for the university's Korea Institute. His talks were in part based on his paper, Socrates vs. Confucius: An Analysis of South Korea's Implementation of the American Law School Model.

Kim is the founder and CEO of Asia Pacific Global Research Group, which provides value-added analysis focused on South Korea and the greater Asia-Pacific markets. His clients have included both private sector companies as well as government agencies. He also contributed in launching ohmydocs.com, a student PowerPoint website. Additionally, he has been invited to a diverse array of conferences, such as with Google, Harvard, and the United Nations.

Media
Kim has been featured on Al Jazeera TV, Christian Science Monitor, Voice of America (VOA), among others, and has written several op-eds in the Wall Street Journal (WSJ), including "Asian Education's Failing Grade", "The Iphoning of Korea", "Korea's Next Credit Boom -- and Bust", "The Coming Korean Bubble", and  "Korea's Missing Ingredient".

He has also been featured on global media outlets such as BBC TV, BBC News, Bloomberg News, Bloomberg TV, CNBC TV, Los Angeles Times, New York Times/ International Herald Tribune, and NPR, among others, on issues related to Asia and South Korea.

Publications
Kim writes academic articles, including in journals affiliated with Harvard University, Columbia University, the University of California, the University of Hawaii, and Seoul National University, as well as in Global Policy (Black-Wiley), East Asia: An International Quarterly, and the Korea Journal of Defense Analysis (Routledge).

He is the author of the following books:
Persuasion: The Hidden Forces That Influence Negotiations (Routledge 2018)
American Law 101: An Easy Primer on the American Legal System
ABA Fundamentals: International Economic Systems
24 Hours with 24 Lawyers: Profiles of Traditional and Non-Traditional Careers
Korean Business Law: The Legal Landscape and Beyond
From University Graduate to Master of the Universe: Strategies for Launching a Global Professional Career
Crisis and Change: South Korea in a Post-1997 New Era

References

External links
 Asia-Pacific Global Research Group
 ABA Fundamentals: International Economic Systems (ABA Press, 2012)
 24 Hours with 24 Lawyers: Profiles of Traditional and Non-Traditional Careers, at amazon.com

Living people
Academic staff of Ewha Womans University
Year of birth missing (living people)